The Power is a 1984 American supernatural horror film directed by Stephen Carpenter and Jeffrey Obrow. It stars Suzy Stokey, Warren Lincoln, Lisa Erickson, Chad Christian, Ben Gilbert and Chris Morrill. The plot tells about an evil spirit trapped inside an ancient Aztec doll, which possesses a young man after he takes it.

Plot

An Aztec demon called Destacatyl, who is believed to be able to control human souls, is trapped in a small Aztec doll. However, a young man named Jerry is soon possessed and taken over by the demon after getting his hands on the idol and soon causes mayhem to anyone he comes across, including a group of high school students.

Cast

Release
The Power had a limited theatrical release on January 20, 1984 by Artists Releasing Corporation, and was released on VHS by Vestron Video the same year. It was released on DVD on January 7, 2017 by Scorpion Releasing.

References

External links
 
 
 
 

1984 films
1984 horror films
1984 independent films
1980s supernatural horror films
American independent films
American supernatural horror films
Demons in film
Films about spirit possession
Films scored by Christopher Young
Films shot in California
1980s English-language films
Films directed by Jeffrey Obrow
Films directed by Stephen Carpenter
1980s American films